Marder may refer to:

German military vehicles
 A series of World War II tank destroyers:
 Marder I
 Marder II
 Marder III
 Marder (IFV), a modern infantry fighting vehicle
 Marder (submarine), a World War II midget submarine

People with the surname
 Arthur Marder (1910–1980), American historian
 Barry Marder, American stand-up comedian
 Darius Marder, American film director and screenwriter
 Eve Marder, American neuroscientist
 Janet Marder, American female rabbi
 Larry Marder, American cartoonist
 Malerie Marder, American photographer
 Marlene Marder, Swiss guitarist
 Maureen Marder, exotic dancer and welder whose life was the basis of Flashdance
 Michael Marder, Basque contemporary philosopher
 Rebecca Marder, French actress
 Seth Marder, American chemist
 Steven Marder, dotcom executive

Other uses
 Marder (Zoids), a zoid from Zoids

See also
 Marten (disambiguation), "marder" is German for the animal marten